Petrus Johannes van Regemorter (8 September 1755 – 17 November 1830) was a Flemish landscape and genre painter, born in Antwerp. He was a pupil of the Academy of that city, but he owed much to his study of the pictures in some private collections. He became a professor in the Academy, and Dean in the Painters' Guild in 1786. Many artists of note studied under him, and he had a large practice as a picture-restorer. In 1814 he was engaged in bringing back the pictures taken by the French to Paris. He died in 1830. In the Antwerp Museum is a Shepherd and Flock by him. He excelled in painting moonlights.

His son, also his pupil, was the painter Ignatius Josephus van Regemorter.

References

External links
 

1755 births
1830 deaths
18th-century Flemish painters
Belgian genre painters
Royal Academy of Fine Arts (Antwerp) alumni
Academic staff of the Royal Academy of Fine Arts (Antwerp)